Werdau station is a station on the Leipzig–Hof railway in Werdau in the German state of Saxony. Until 2000, the Werdau–Mehltheuer railway branched off here, but this section of the line is now closed.

History
The station was opened in 1845. Traffic on the line south of the station ran over the wye junction towards Reichenbach im Vogtland, Hof, Munich and the Allgäu as well as towards Zwickau, Chemnitz and Dresden. It is one of the oldest railway stations in Saxony.

The branch line to Wünschendorf, also called the Thüringer Waldbahn (Thuringian Forest Railway), was opened in 1876. A new station building was opened in 1877 and it was extended in 1907. It has a stuccoed dining room, railway apartments, a luggage handling facility and a railway post office, as well as houses for the station staff.

Around 1900, the station was rebuilt and the route to Wünschendorf changed. Instead of connecting to the station from the south, it now entered from the north, connecting to the Leipzig–Hof railway at a flying junction with a track of the line to Wünschendorf built above the Plauen–Leipzig line.

Werdau became a rail junction, an important center with a locomotive depot (Bahnbetriebswerk) and a carriage works. There was also a locomotive shed. Werdau became a leading industrial city.

Passenger traffic to Wünschendorf was discontinued in 1999. Subsequently, some facilities were dismantled. The flying junction north of the station was removed, a road bypass was built without abridge over the path of the railway, so the line is now broken between Werdau West and Werdau.

An electronic interlocking was put into operation in 1999.

The historic station, which was partly renovated up to 2003, will become a stop for public transport in 2017. The monument protection of the station was lifted in 2016. Many citizens have signed a petition to preserve the station. The civic association Wir in Werdau Süd e.V. ("We in Werdau South"), which stands for the preservation of Werdau station was founded in 2016.

In the 2017 timetable, services to Werdau will be replaced by lines S5 and S5X of the S-Bahn Mitteldeutschland (Halle (Saale) Hbf–Zwickau (Sachs) Hbf) and line R2 operated by the Vogtlandbahn (Zwickau (Sachs) Hbf–Cheb). The trains of the R2 service will reverse in Werdau to continue their journeys.

Infrastructure
The tracks are accessed through the historic railway station. In 2000, direct railway access to platform 1, the Werdau–Mehltheuer railway platform, was removed and the other platforms (tracks 1–4, now only having access through the station hall) were modernised. Before the modern development, access to the railway tracks was also possible directly from the street. New doors, windows, floors, false ceilings, a disabled toilet, a new heating system, a new ticket vending machines as well as a renovated retail area in the former luggage storage area were built up to 2000.

Connections
Werdau has bus stops in front of the historic station building. Daily, three or four buses stop next to the footpath in front of the station entrance. Buses can also stop in front of the former dining room. There are also several large covered bus stops, as well as a covered taxis area just in front of the historic station.

There are about 50 parking spaces at the station building. State road 289 is to the west of the station, but it is not directly accessible.

References

External links 

 
 

Railway stations in Saxony
Buildings and structures in Zwickau (district)
Railway stations in Germany opened in 1845
1845 establishments in Saxony